Wrotham Park (pronounced) is a neo-Palladian English country house in the parish of South Mimms, Hertfordshire. It lies south of the town of Potters Bar,  from Hyde Park Corner in central London. The house was designed by Isaac Ware in 1754 for Admiral John Byng, the fourth son of Admiral George Byng, 1st Viscount Torrington, and remains in the family at the heart of a  estate. It is one of the largest private houses near London inside the M25 motorway. Its distinctive exterior has been used over 60 times as a filming location.

The house is listed as a Grade II* building on the National Heritage List for England, and its landscaped park and gardens are Grade II listed on the Register of Historic Parks and Gardens.

History
Originally part of an estate known as Pinchbank (also Birchbank), first recorded in Middlesex in 1310 and owned in the 17th and early 18th centuries by the Howkins family, the property passed to Thomas Reynolds, a director of the South Sea Company, who renamed the estate Strangeways.  His son, Francis, sold the property to Admiral John Byng who had the house rebuilt by Isaac Ware in 1754.

Admiral John Byng changed the name of the house to Wrotham Park in honour of the original family home in Wrotham, Kent. Byng never had an opportunity to live in retirement at Wrotham. Following his inadequately equipped expedition to relieve Menorca from the French during the Seven Years' War, he was court martialled and executed in 1757. This event was satirised by Voltaire in his novel Candide. In Portsmouth, Candide witnesses the execution of an officer by firing squad; and is told that "in this country, it is wise to kill an admiral from time to time to encourage the others" (pour encourager les autres).

The house was inherited by John Byng, 1st Earl of Strafford in 1847 and passed to his son, George Byng, 2nd Earl of Strafford, on the first earl's death in 1860. A disastrous fire in 1883 burned slowly enough to permit retrieval of the contents of the house, but gutted it. The house was rebuilt exactly as it was and still remains in the hands of the Byng family.

Filming location
Wrotham Park has often been used as a filming location including: Hart to Hart; White Mischief (1987); Inspector Morse (1989); Jeeves and Wooster (1990–1993); King Ralph (1991); Bridget Jones's Diary (2001); Gosford Park (2001); Peter's Friends; 2004 film version of Vanity Fair; The Line of Beauty (2006); Sense and Sensibility (2008); Norland Park was filmed there; 2011 version of Jane Eyre; The Hour (2011); 2012 film version of Great Expectations; Kingsman: The Secret Service, Kingsman: The Golden Circle and The King's Man; Mr Selfridge (2014); Agatha Christie's Poirot episodes "The Adventure of Johnnie Waverly" and Third Girl; The Gentleman (2019); Downton Abbey; The Crown and Bridgerton (2022).

Social events

Pavlos, Crown Prince of Greece and the former Marie-Chantal Miller had a pre-wedding reception attended by approximately 1,300 guests two days before their 1 July 1995 wedding.

Chelsea and England footballer Ashley Cole and Girls Aloud singer Cheryl had their wedding blessed at Wrotham Park on 15 July 2006 – they weren't allowed to have their wedding there because Wrotham Park did not have a licence to hold civil weddings.

References

External links

Wrotham Park as filming location, The Internet Movie Database
Photos of the house

Country houses in Hertfordshire
Gardens by Capability Brown
Grade II listed parks and gardens in Hertfordshire
Grade II* listed buildings in Hertfordshire
Grade II* listed houses
Hertsmere
History of Middlesex
Home farms
Houses completed in 1754
Middlesex
Palladian architecture